Bishop Symeon (born Du Runchen, Russian name Fyodor Semyonovich Du, ; February 11, 1886 - March 3, 1965) was bishop of the Chinese Orthodox Church. He was the last Eastern Orthodox bishop of Shanghai before the abolition of the see.

Biography 
He was born on February 11, 1886, in Beijing to a family of Albazinian origin. His father was a church reader. He and his family escaped miraculously during Boxer Rebellion of 1900.

From 1902, he served as psalm reader at the Church of the Presentation of the Lord at the Russian Embassy in Beijing. In 1904, he graduated from the missionary school at the Russian Orthodox Mission in Beijing and for several years served as a psalm reader and catechist in the Yung-ping-fu area (Peitaiho).

In 1908, Bishop Innocent (Figurovsky), chief of the mission, ordained him a deacon. In 1909 Bishop Innocent appointed him to serve at the mission's metochion, the Annunciation Church, in Harbin. In addition to his duties as deacon, he served as a missionary, the treasurer, and manager of the parish's office in Harbin. With the arrival of many refugee Christians from Russia in 1919, he was active in publishing Russian textbooks for the schools in Harbin.

His life as a missionary took him to many cities in China, including Shanghai, Hankou, Haimen, Kaifeng, Weihou, and Mukden, as well as to localities in Manchuria. In 1932, he was assigned to duties in Tianjin where, in 1934, he was elevated to protodeacon.

On September 16, 1941, he was ordained to the priesthood and made priest-in-charge of the St. Innocent Mission Church in Tianjin. In 1943, he was elevated to archpriest and in 1945, he was awarded a “palitza”. In early 1950, he traveled to the Soviet Union, where he accompanied Patriarch Alexius to a conference in Tbilisi, Georgia, of the Russian Orthodox Church, Georgian Orthodox Church, and Armenian Apostolic Church.

On July 23, 1950, at Trinity-Sergius Lavra, he was tonsured a monk with name Symeon. On July 23, he was raised to archimandrite. On July 30, in the Cathedral of the Annunciation in Moscow he was consecrated Bishop of Tianjin.

On September 26, 1950, Bishop Simeon was appointed as Bishop of Shanghai.

He died on March 3, 1965, in Shanghai.

References

External links 
 ЕПИСКОП ШАНХАЙСКИЙ СИМЕОН (ДУ) // pravoslavie.ru
 Hieromonk Damascene Christ the Eternal Tao. Valaam Books, 2004, page 437-438
 Handbook of Christianity in China, Volume 2. BRILL, 2009. page 828-829

Chinese Orthodox Church
Bishops of the Russian Orthodox Church
1886 births
1965 deaths
Eastern Orthodox Christians from China
Chinese people of Russian descent
Chinese bishops
Christianity in Shanghai